The 7.62×45mm (designated as the 7,62 × 45 by the C.I.P.) is a rimless bottlenecked intermediate rifle cartridge developed in Czechoslovakia. It is fired by the Czech Vz. 52 rifle, Vz. 52 light machine gun, and ZB-53 machine gun. The round was later dropped from use when the Czech converted to the standard Warsaw Pact round, the 7.62×39mm (fired by vz. 52/57 rifle and vz. 52/57 light machine gun). Its muzzle velocity and muzzle energy are slightly higher than that of the 7.62×39mm cartridge.

Cartridge dimensions
The 7.62×45mm has 2.79 ml (43.1 grains H2O) cartridge case capacity.
The exterior shape of the case was designed to promote reliable case feeding and extraction in bolt action and semi-automatic rifles and machine guns alike, under extreme conditions.

7.62×45mm maximum C.I.P. cartridge dimensions. All sizes in millimeters (mm).

Americans would define the shoulder angle at alpha/2 ≈ 24.9 degrees.
The common rifling twist rate for this cartridge is 280 mm (1 in 11.03 in), 4 grooves, Ø lands = , Ø grooves = , land width =  and the primer type is Berdan or Boxer (in large rifle size).

According to the official C.I.P. (Commission Internationale Permanente pour l'Epreuve des Armes à Feu Portatives) rulings the 7.62×45mm can handle up to  Pmax piezo pressure. In C.I.P. regulated countries every rifle cartridge combo has to be proofed at 125% of this maximum C.I.P. pressure to certify for sale to consumers.
This means that 7.62×45mm chambered arms in C.I.P. regulated countries are currently (2014) proof tested at  PE piezo pressure.

Non-official dimensions
There are definite differences in reported dimensions from non-official sources for this cartridge. Some of this may be accounted for by small errors in conversion from metric to inches, while others such as loaded length may additionally be attributed to different lengths of bullets being measured in loaded rounds. A sample list of various measurements is in the table below.

Dimensionally similar

The 6.5mm Grendel cartridge is extremely close dimensionally.  It is a common option used when re-barreling the Czech Vz.52 carbine to an easily available factory or Boxer primed reloadable cartridge.  6.5 Grendel was originally designed for the AR15 class of firearms, and therefore has power level (pressure) ratings that are within the limits of that class.  As such, the C.I.P. listed pressure levels for the 6.5 Grendel are lower than those listed by the C.I.P for the 7.62x45.

Wildcats
The 7.62×45mm case is also used as the parent case for a modified variant that is not officially registered with or sanctioned by the C.I.P. or its American equivalent, the SAAMI. Such cartridges which use commercial factory cases are generally known as wildcats. By changing the shape of standard factory cases (decreasing case taper and/or changing the shoulder geometry) the wildcatter generally increases the case capacity of the factory parent cartridge case, allowing more propellant to be used to generate higher velocities. Besides changing the shape and internal volume of the parent cartridge case, wildcatters also can change the original calibre. A reason to change the original calibre can be to comply with a minimal permitted calibre or bullet weight for the legal hunting of certain species of game or change external or terminal ballistic behavior. In his spare time Chis E. Murray has been developing a cartridge which he calls the 7×46mm Universal Intermediate Assault Cartridge. The 7×46mm is designed to replace both the 5.56mm and 7.62mm NATO cartridges. It is low recoil and so can be used from carbines, but has long enough range to be used in machine guns and designated marksmen rifles. Its overall length has been optimized so that guns chambering it would be bigger than AR-15s but smaller than AR-10s.

Reloading for the VZ-52 rifle in this chambering is a nuisance in the US.  Boxer-primed cases can be easily formed via resizing and trimming 6.5mm Carcano brass, but these are difficult to obtain.  Another route is to use Winchester .220" Swift, but in addition to resizing and trimming, this also requires turning the rims down on a lathe and cutting deeper extractor grooves.  Speer makes a 130-grain .308" bullet which would otherwise be perfect for this round.

Gallery

See also

 7 mm caliber
 List of rifle cartridges

References

Pistol and rifle cartridges
Military cartridges